Trinity Methodist Church, also known as Trinity United Methodist Church and New Light Baptist Church, is a historic Methodist church located in Richmond, Virginia. It was built between 1859 and 1875, and is a three-story, Italianate style stuccoed brick structure. It features a three-stage central tower, with an octagonal third stage that rises above the ridge of the gable roof. The tower once had a fourth stage open octagonal belfry and spire, which was removed in 1955 after being damaged in Hurricane Hazel.

It was listed on the National Register of Historic Places in 1987.

References

Churches on the National Register of Historic Places in Virginia
Italianate architecture in Virginia
Churches completed in 1875
19th-century Methodist church buildings in the United States
Methodist churches in Virginia
Churches in Richmond, Virginia
National Register of Historic Places in Richmond, Virginia
Italianate church buildings in the United States